Molin may refer to:

 Molin (surname)
 Molin, Banat, a former village in Banat, Nova Crnja municipality, Vojvodina province, Serbia
 Molin Forest, on the site of the former village
 Molin, Homalin, a village in Homalin Township, Sagaing Region, Burma
 Xie Molin (born 1979), Chinese artist

See also 
 Molino (disambiguation)
 Molins (disambiguation)